The Mindoro boobook or Mindoro hawk-owl (Ninox mindorensis) is a species of owl in the family Strigidae that is endemic to the Philippines.

Description
EBird describes the bird as "A fairly small owl of lowland and foothill forest and woodland. Rather dark brown on the head and back and reddish-brown on the chest, with bright yellow eyes and thin white eyebrows forming a V. Mindoro scops-owl is similar in size and color, but Mindoro boobook is finely barred all over. Much smaller than chocolate boobook, without white on the chest. Song is a fairly high-pitched, descending mournful whistle, 'wiiiiuuuuu'."

Among the Philippine hawk-owl species complex, it is distinguished by the fine barring on its head and belly and its overall darker plumage.

The Mindoro boobook is an earless species. The males and females look much alike. 

It is medium-sized at 20cm tall, along with the Sulu boobook, in the Philippine hawk-owl species complex. This is in between the larger Camiguin boobook, Romblon boobook and Cebu boobook at 25cm and the smaller Luzon boobook and Mindanao boobook which are 15 to 18cm tall.

Habitat and Conservation Status 
Its habitat is in tropical moist lowland primary and secondary forests up to 1250 meters above sea level. It is also occasionally seen on forest edges, clearings and plantations.  

The IUCN Red List classifies this bird as vulnerable with population estimates of 2,500 to 9,999 mature individuals. This species' main threat is habitat loss with wholesale clearance of forest habitats as a result of legal and illegal logging, mining, conversion into farmlands and urbanization. Lowland forest destruction has eradicated almost all of this bird's habitat. In 1988, just 120 km2 of forest remained on Mindoro, of which only 25% was closed-canopy.

It occurs in a few protected areas in Mounts Iglit-Baco National Park (which is also the stronghold of the critically endangered Tamaraw) and Naujan Lake National Park.

There is no species-specific conservation program at present, but conservation actions proposed include more species surveys to better understand habitat and population, initiating education and awareness campaigns to raise the species' profile and instill pride in locals, and lobbying for protection of the remaining forest.

References

 Kennedy, R.S., Gonzales P.C., Dickinson E.C., Miranda, Jr, H.C., Fisher T.H. (2000) A Guide to the Birds of the Philippines, Oxford University Press, Oxford.

Mindoro boobook
Birds of Mindoro
Mindoro boobook
Mindoro boobook